The Lowell Thomas Travel Journalism Awards are administered by the U.S.-based  Society of American Travel Writers Foundation (SATW Foundation), a nonprofit organization founded in the early 1980s to recognize excellence in travel journalism. The first awards were given in 1985 for work done in 1984. The competition is named after Lowell Thomas,  the celebrated 20th century travel journalist and broadcaster. It is open to journalists from around the world and is considered one of the premier professional awards programs for travel journalists and communicators. Entrants (in the early 2020s, more than 1200 annually) include major media outlets, staff writers and editors, freelancers, book authors, digital communicators, and journalism fellows from such institutions as the Pulitzer Center. The competition honors works in more than two dozen categories, including print, digital, audio, video and photography. Winners are announced at the SATW (Society of America Travel Writers) annual convention and receive cash prizes.

The competition attracts entries from, and is covered by, major media, including the New York Times, Chicago Tribune, Los Angeles Times, Orange County Register, Washington Post,Cleveland Plain Dealer, Oregonian, Outside magazine, and Globe and Mail.

Categories

The Grand Award (Travel Journalist of the Year) is given to an editor or writer whose work excels in at least five of the awards categories. In 1985 (the first year awards were given), there were 15 categories. In the intervening years, new categories, including blogging, websites, video, and multi-media, were added to reflect the changing journalism landscape. For the awards announced in 2021, a new category travel for health and safety was added, and the list had expanded to 27 categories: Grand Award, Travel Health/Safety Coverage, Newspaper Travel Coverage, Travel Magazines, Travel Coverage in General Magazines, U.S./Canada Travel,  Foreign Travel, Photo Illustration of Travel, Special Packages/Series, Cruise Travel, Adventure Travel, Travel News/Investigative Reporting, Service-Oriented Consumer Work, Environmental and Sustainable Tourism, Cultural Tourism, Personal Comment, Special-Purpose Travel, Short Work on Travel, Culinary-Related Travel, Travel Book, Guidebook, Travel Journalism Websites, Travel Audio, Travel Audio (Podcasts and Guides), Travel Video, Travel Blogs, Multimedia Single Work.

Judging

Entries are judged by members of the journalism faculty of an accredited U.S. university, each of which takes on the project for five or six years. Previous judges have included members of the faculties of the University of Missouri School of Journalism, the University of North Carolina-Chapel Hill School of Journalism and Mass Communication, the Northwestern University Medill School of Journalism, and the University of Florida College of Journalism and Communications. In 2015, judging returned to the University of Missouri, which had judged the competition for two previous terms.

Grand Award Winners

Multiple Lowell Thomas Award Winners 

The SATW Foundation maintains a list of all winners by year; the following publications and individuals have garnered the most awards as of 2021:

Publications 

National Geographic Traveler: 122

Seattle Times: 86

Minneapolis Star Tribune: 62

Chicago Tribune: 59

Islands magazine: 59

Los Angeles Times: 52

Outside magazine: 47

San Francisco Chronicle: 40 (20 as Examiner-Chronicle)

Boston Globe: 39

Record (NJ): 39

Travel + Leisure: 38

National Geographic Adventure: 37

Oregonian: 36

Frommer's: 36 (varying media)

Washington Post: 35

Orange County Register: 35

USA Today :28

New York Times: 27

Miami Herald: 22

Dallas Morning News: 21

Lonely Planet: 19

Chicago Sun-Times: 18

Afar: 17 (since 2010)

New Orleans Times-Picayune: 16

Southern Living magazine: 16

Individuals 

Catherine Watson: Minneapolis Star Tribune 29.

Jill Schensul: (The Record/North Jersey Media Group) 29

Alan Solomon: 25 (Chicago Tribune) 25

Chris Welsch: (Minneapolis Star Tribune) 19

Gary Stoller: (Conde Nast Traveler and USA Today) 12

Christopher Reynolds: (Los Angeles Times) 11

Don George: (various media) 10

References

External links
SATW Foundation official website

American literary awards
American journalism awards
Travel writing